Ak-Jar is a village in Naryn Region of Kyrgyzstan. It is part of the At-Bashy District. Its population was 5,559 in 2021.

Population

References

Populated places in Naryn Region